Anatole Alexandre François Henri Baron Brenier de Renaudière (22 August 1807, Paris – 27 March 1885 La Lucassière (Vouvray, Indre-et-Loire)) was a French diplomat and politician.

After being secretary in London and Lisbon, he became consul of France in Warsaw after the death of Raymond Durand (1837), and was later general consul in Florence.

In 1847, he took his father's succession as Director of Finances (Directeur des Fonds et de la Comptabilité) of the Ministry of Foreign Affairs.

He was chosen by Louis Napoléon Bonaparte as Foreign Minister from 24 January to 10 April 1851.

He was ambassador of France to Naples up to the Garibaldian invasion.

He then became a senator on 24 May 1861.

He had married Isabelle Unwina Hely Hutchinson.

Link 
Anciens sénateurs du Second Empire (in French)

References

1807 births
1885 deaths
Politicians from Paris
French Foreign Ministers